Caroline Marton (born 14 April 1984) is an Australian taekwondo athlete from Melbourne, Australia.

In attempting to qualify for the 2012 Olympics she was disqualified in the final match with seconds remaining.

She won the 2016 Oceania Taekwondo Olympic Qualification Tournament as the only competitor in her weight class and therefore is qualified to compete at the 2016 Olympics.

She is the sister of world taekwondo champion Carmen Marton.  She and her sister are training partners.

References

1984 births
Living people
Sportspeople from Melbourne
Australian people of Polish descent
Australian female taekwondo practitioners
Victorian Institute of Sport alumni
Olympic taekwondo practitioners of Australia
Taekwondo practitioners at the 2016 Summer Olympics
Universiade medalists in taekwondo
Universiade bronze medalists for Australia
Medalists at the 2007 Summer Universiade
21st-century Australian women